The 2017–18 Prairie View A&M Panthers basketball team represented Prairie View A&M University during the 2017–18 NCAA Division I men's basketball season. The Panthers, led by second-year head coach Byron Smith, played their home games at the William Nicks Building in Prairie View, Texas as members of the Southwestern Athletic Conference. They finished the season 16–18, 12–6 in SWAC play to finish in a three-way tie for second place. Due to Grambling State's Academic Progress Rate violations and subsequent postseason ineligibility, the Panthers received the No. 2 seed in the SWAC tournament. They defeated Alcorn State in the quarterfinals before losing to Texas Southern in the semifinals.

Previous season
The Panthers finished the 2016–17 season 13–20, 10–8 in SWAC play to finish in a four-way tie for third place. As the No. 4 seed in the SWAC tournament, they lost to Grambling State in the quarterfinals.

Roster

Schedule and results

|-
!colspan=9 style=|Non-conference regular season

|-
!colspan=9 style=| SWAC regular season

|-
!colspan=9 style=| SWAC tournament

References 

Prairie View A&M Panthers basketball seasons
Prairie View AandM